Knoxville is an unincorporated community in Greene County, Alabama, United States. Knoxville had a post office until it closed on August 29, 2009; it still has its own ZIP code, 35469.

Notable people
 James Hardy, former professional basketball player for the New Orleans Jazz
 William W. May, running athlete who competed in the 1908 Summer Olympics

References

Unincorporated communities in Greene County, Alabama
Unincorporated communities in Alabama